is a Japanese footballer currently playing as a midfielder for Azul Claro Numazu.

Career statistics

Club
.

Notes

References

1998 births
Living people
Kanto Gakuin University alumni
Japanese footballers
Association football midfielders
J3 League players
Azul Claro Numazu players